Romana Brigitta Kaiser is a Swiss-born Liechtensteiner figure skater who represents Liechtenstein in ladies' singles. She is the 2019 Triglav Trophy silver medalist, and a four-time Liechtensteiner national champion (2017–2020).

Competitive highlights 
CS: Challenger Series; JGP: Junior Grand Prix

References 

1997 births
Living people
Swiss female single skaters
Liechtenstein sportswomen
Liechtenstein people of Swiss descent
21st-century Liechtenstein women
People from the canton of St. Gallen
Competitors at the 2019 Winter Universiade